The 1979 World Sambo Championships were held in Madrid, Spain on December 11 to 14 1979. Championships were organized by FILA.

Medal overview

External links 
Results on Sambo.net.ua

World Sambo Championships
World Sambo Championships
World Sambo Championships
International sports competitions hosted by Spain
Sports competitions in Madrid
World Sambo Championships